António Aires dos Santos Aparício (born 15 September 1958 in Paúl, Covilhã) is a Portuguese former footballer who played as a striker.

External links

1958 births
Living people
Portuguese footballers
Association football forwards
Ligue 2 players
Championnat National 2 players
FC Sochaux-Montbéliard players
FC Villefranche Beaujolais players
Primeira Liga players
Liga Portugal 2 players
Segunda Divisão players
Vitória F.C. players
S.C. Braga players
C.D. Nacional players
C.D. Montijo players
Leixões S.C. players
Portugal under-21 international footballers
Portugal international footballers
Portuguese expatriate footballers
Expatriate footballers in France
Portuguese expatriate sportspeople in France
People from Covilhã
Sportspeople from Castelo Branco District